"Death of a Batman" is the fifth episode of the third series of the 1960s cult British spy-fi television series The Avengers, starring Patrick Macnee and Honor Blackman. It was first broadcast by ABC on 26 October 1963. The episode was directed by Kim Mills and written by Roger Marshall.

Plot
Steed attends his wartime batman's funeral and discovers that the deceased has unexpectedly left a very substantial sum of money. Kathy's photography leads to violence and electronics. The answer to the mystery involves illegal insider trading.

Cast
 Patrick Macnee as John Steed
 Honor Blackman as Cathy Gale 
 André Morell as Lord Basil Teale
 Philip Madoc as Eric Van Doren 
 Katy Greenwood as Lady Cynthia Bellamy 
 David Burke as John Wrightson 
 Geoffrey Alexander as Victor Gibbs 
 Kitty Atwood as Edith Wrightson
 Ray Browne as Cooper

References

External links

Episode overview on The Avengers Forever! website

The Avengers (season 3) episodes
1963 British television episodes